The Road Atlanta Can-Am  races were Can-Am series sports car races held at Road Atlanta in Braselton, Georgia, from 1970 until 1984.

Winners

See also
Grand Prix of Atlanta
Petit Le Mans

External links
World Sports Racing Prototypes Can-Am archive
Racing Sports Cars Road Atlanta archive
Ultimate Racing History Road Atlanta archive